The 1992 season was the 72nd season of competitive football (soccer) in Estonia, and the first one in the Baltic country as an independent nation. The championship was played in the spring of 1992.

National Leagues

Meistriliiga

Esiliiga

Cup Final
No FA Cup was held in 1992.

National Team

Notes

External links
1992 season on RSSSF
RSSSF Historic Results
RSSSF National Team Results
RSSSF Baltic Cup 1992

 
Seasons in Estonian football